Erica Flor Rivera (born December 18, 1988) is an American actress, singer, rapper, dancer, and artist who played a minor role as Bianca on the Disney Channel show That's So Raven.

Rivera, who was born in Philadelphia, Pennsylvania, is also a part-time singer, and has a song in the film What a Girl Wants titled "Somebody Stop Me", in addition to a song on the soundtrack of the film Akeelah and the Bee, titled "Let Your Baby Go".

Filmography

External links
 
Erica Rivera on Instagram
Erica Rivera on Facebook
Erica Rivera on MySpace
Erica Rivera on Twitter
Erica Rivera on YouTube
Erica Rivera on ReverbNation

1988 births
Living people
Actresses from Philadelphia
American child actresses
American television actresses
American actresses of Mexican descent
Hispanic and Latino American actresses
21st-century American actresses
21st-century American singers
21st-century American women singers